Multiple is an album by American saxophonist Joe Henderson, released in 1973 on Milestone. It was recorded mainly on January 30–31, 1973, but producer Keepnews stated there had also been a couple of additional recordings in February and April. The musicians involved include keyboardist Larry Willis, guitarist James “Blood” Ulmer, bassist Dave Holland and drummer Jack DeJohnette.

Track listing
All pieces by Joe Henderson, unless otherwise noted.

"Tress-Cun-Deo-La" - 10:36
"Bwaata" (DeJohnette) - 10:56
"Song for Sinners" - 6:26
"Turned Around" (Holland) - 6:39
"Me, Among Others" - 7:05

Basic tracks recorded on January 30 (1, 2, 5) and 31 (3-4), 1973. Overdubs recorded on February 2, April 5 and 13, 1973.

Personnel
Joe Henderson - tenor sax (1-5), soprano sax (1), percussion (1, 3), flutes (1), vocals (1, 3)
Larry Willis - electric piano, ring modulator, Echoplex
James Ulmer (1), John Thomas (3) - guitar
Dave Holland - bass, electric bass
Jack DeJohnette - drums
Arthur Jenkins  - congas, percussion

References

Milestone Records albums
Joe Henderson albums
1973 albums